Three Telegrams (French: Trois télégrammes) is a 1950 French drama film directed by Henri Decoin and starring Gérard Gervais, Pierrette Simonet and Olivier Hussenot. The film's art direction was by Auguste Capelier. It was made at the Billancourt Studios in Paris.

Cast

References

Bibliography 
 Rège, Philippe. Encyclopedia of French Film Directors, Volume 1. Scarecrow Press, 2009.

External links 
 

1950 films
1950 drama films
French drama films
1950s French-language films
Films directed by Henri Decoin
French black-and-white films
Films shot at Billancourt Studios
Films scored by Joseph Kosma
1950s French films